The Philippine Support Association (PSA) is a group that aims to raise credit for the poor in the Philippines so that they can break free of the poverty trap. It supports microfinance.

History 
The Philippine Support Association was registered on 12 November 2007 under its full name Oikocredit Ecumenical Development Cooperative Society (EDCS) Philippine Support Association Inc. The group's stated purpose is "to support and participate in the promotion of global justice by encouraging/challenging people, churches and others to share their resources through socially responsible investments and by empowering disadvantaged people with credit."

Aims and objectives 
The aims and objectives of the association are essentially to create more opportunities for people’s socio-economic development. It facilitates long-term loans, loan guarantees and investments for cooperatives and socially-orientated groups. It aims to promote;

Cooperation in development by mobilizing financial resources for economic growth consistent with social justice and self- reliance.
Pooling of financial and creative resources for cooperative enterprises.
Cooperative tie-ups to enable individual cooperative members to become active, socially secure, and economically empowered community members.

Membership 
Currently membership are shareholders who purchase shares at $/E200 a share. Shareholders are not limited to individuals and by far the biggest shareholders are congregations and schools. Around 16 individuals, 22 schools and congregations, and several parish own shares. The association is a member of the Ecumenical Development Cooperative Society (EDCS).

Facts and figures 
Of the 36 Philippine Support Association supports Oikocredit projects in the Philippines. Oikocredit active in the Philippines the majority are straight microfinance loans (67%), with the remainder being entirely devoted to loans for production (33%). Of this 33%  3 projects (8%) are loans to sugar producers, 2 projects (6%) each for bamboo, housing and food projects, and 1 project (3%) to reforestation, marketing, and livestock projects.

The majority of the projects (16) are located in Luzon region (44%). the Visayas region has 14 projects running (39%) and Mindanao has 9 projects representing 17% of the total. Mindanao once had its own satellite office (meaning the Philippines would have had two offices as well as the regional office) but was forced to close. There are difficulties in microfinancing in Mindanao, but Oikocredit and the association are seeking to overcome these issues to continue their work on poverty reduction.

The role of the association in these loans is fairly simple, it seeks to raise funds to fund Oikocredit's work in the Philippines. There is no shortage of demand and the more money it can raise the more it can help.

Cooperatives in the Philippines